Bernado Luis Cotoner y Ballester (1571 – 1641), son of Antonio Cotoner y Vallobar in his second marriage, dedicated his life to the study of law, and at the University of Avignon received his Tassels both in Canon law and Roman Law.

In good age he joined the Ecclesial Estate. Member of the Dominican Order, he came to be Apostolic Inquisitor of the Kingdom of Sardinia, in 1629 became Inquisitor in the kingdoms of Majorca, Aragon, Valencia and in the County of Barcelona. He died in 1641 when acting as "visitador" to the Holy office in Sicily.

References

House of Cotoner
Inquisitors
1571 births
1641 deaths